Comicranga was a coastal Tongva village located at what is now the area of Santa Monica, California. The village is also referred to as Comigranga, Comicraibit, Comicrabit, and possibly Coronababit. It is most notable as the home village of Bartolomea, or Victoria Reid after marriage, a respected Indigenous woman in Mexican California, who was the wife of Hugo Reid.

History

Indigenous 

The village was established in the coastal region of western Tovaangar. As a coastal village, the usage of te'aats may have been important to the village's people. Villagers likely ate acorns, seeds, berries, small game, fish and shellfish. Shell mounds were also likely a part of the village.

The village was connected to the Chumash through marriage ties. The village was located near Guashna.

Mission San Gabriel 
Following the establishment of Mission San Gabriel in 1771, surrounding villages were gradually depleted of villagers, who were taken to the mission for conversion to Christianity as a labor force to work the mission grounds. Villagers worked in de facto slave conditions that were viewed by third-party observers at Mission San Gabriel as repulsive to watch.

The earliest recorded baptisms of people being taken to Mission San Gabriel began in 1790. These baptisms reportedly peaked around 1803 and 1805, and then dropped off by 1819. This was around the same time land in the area of the village was being acquired by ranchers.

In 1812, it was recorded by Franciscan missionaries that a language dialect may have originated from the village which they referred to as "Kokomcar."

Many of the villagers died at the mission. There were a total of 7,854 baptisms (2,459 children) and 5,656 deaths (2,916 children) until secularization in 1834 at the mission, indicating a very high rate of death. Children died very young at the missions. One missionary at Mission San Gabriel reported that three out of every four children born died before reaching the age of two.

The mission period ended with the passage of the Mexican secularization act in 1833 by the First Mexican Republic, with secularization at Mission San Gabriel occurring shortly after.

Victoria Bartolomea Reid 

Bartolomea was born at Comicranga between 1808 and 1810 as the daughter of the chief of the village. She was taken from the village and her parents at the age of six, for conversion to Christianity at Mission San Gabriel and to live in a guarded dormitory. She is notable as one of the few Indigenous people, and women, who were granted a land grant, the Huerta de Cuati, in the Mexican era.

References 

Tongva populated places
Former Native American populated places in California
History of Los Angeles County, California
History of Santa Monica, California
Native American history of California